Tibor Donner (19 September 1907 – 11 March 1993) was Chief Architect for the Auckland City Council from 1947-1967.

Personal life
Tibor Karoly Donner was born in Szabadka, Austria-Hungary (now known as Subotica and part of Serbia), on 19 September 1907. He was the second child of Ladislaus Cornel Donner, an engineer, and Maria Donner née Kovats de Dalnok. He and his brother Cornel were brought up in the Lutheran faith of their father, and his sister Klara in the mother's Roman Catholic faith.

The family immigrated to New Zealand in 1927 aboard the SS Rimutaka. Donner studied architecture at Auckland University College and from 1935 until 1937 worked privately in the profession. In 1938 he joined the Public Works Department. He remained with the department until 1947 when he established the architectural office at the Auckland City Council. He was the council's Chief Architect until his retirement in 1967.

Donner married Margaret Bennett in 1934. The couple had one child, a daughter also called Margaret. Tibor Donner died at Auckland on 11 March 1993, survived by his wife and his daughter. His work left an enduring legacy to the people of Auckland.

Design
  
Donner's designs incorporated styles from North and South America which were often reflective of high modernism. Although they were influenced by international architectural trends, their usage of local materials also gave them a distinctly New Zealand flavour. Notable structures by Donner include Auckland's Savage Memorial (1941), Avondale Military Hospital - later converted into the high school (1943), Khyber pump station (1947), Parnell Baths (1951–54) and the Auckland City Council's Administration Buildings (1954–60). They reflect the confidence of Auckland during its rapid expansion in the postwar era.

Donner's stylistic influences are particularly evident in the Auckland City Council Administration Building. The building draws significantly from the design principles espoused by Le Corbusier. Donner had visited New York City in 1956 to study Lever House and was aware of emerging contemporary styles (such as those of Ludwig Mies van der Rohe) but chose to reject them. It is significant that Donner had turned away from the more minimal contemporary style of building and the extensive use of glass, since this style is now very common in Auckland.

List of works

Public buildings

Houses
Aside from his work for the Auckland City Council and the Public Works Department, Donner also designed several houses in the hills around Titirangi. His former house is located in Kohu Road, but he also designed several others in the surrounding area for his friends.

References

External links
 A PDF Guide to Tibor Donner's Buildings in Auckland

Yugoslav emigrants to New Zealand
New Zealand public servants
1907 births
1993 deaths
20th-century New Zealand architects
Recipients of the NZIA Gold Medal